Fort William and Rainy River was a federal electoral district represented in the House of Commons of Canada from 1917 to 1925. It was located in the province of Ontario. This riding was created in 1914 from parts of Thunder Bay and Rainy River riding.

It consisted of the southern parts of the territorial districts of Kenora, Rainy River and Thunder Bay.

The electoral district was abolished in 1924 when it was redistributed into Fort William ridings.

Election results

|-
  
|Laurier Liberals-Labour
|Albert Hugh Dennis
|align="right"|2,560   
|}

|}

See also 

 List of Canadian federal electoral districts
 Past Canadian electoral districts

External links 
Riding history from the Library of Parliament

Former federal electoral districts of Ontario
Politics of Thunder Bay